Maurice Clerc may refer to:

 Maurice Clerc (mathematician)
 Maurice Clerc (organist)